Charles Augustus Aiken (October 30, 1827 – January 14, 1892) was an American clergyman and academic.

Biography
He was born in Manchester, Vermont, on October 30, 1827, to John Aiken and Harriet Adams Aiken. He graduated from Dartmouth College in 1846, at the age of nineteen, and went on to Andover Theological Seminary, where he graduated in 1853. He married Sarah Noyes on October 17, 1854, and was ordained a pastor of the Congregational church in Yarmouth, Maine, that same year.

In 1859, he took the position of professor of Latin languages and literature at Dartmouth College, remaining in that position through 1866. He left there to teach at the Princeton University then, and continued there through 1869.

He became president of Union College June 28, 1870, having discharged the duties of the office during the preceding year. He left that position in 1871, to become the first Archibald Alexander professor of Christian ethics and apologetics at Princeton Theological Seminary, which he remained in that position until his death.

In 1870, he translated and edited The Proverbs of Solomon Theologically and Homiletically Expounded he was also an editor of the Princeton Review, and a contributor to other periodicals. He died at Princeton, New Jersey, on January 14, 1892.

Notes

Sources
Who Was Who in America: Historical Volume, 1607-1892. Chicago: Marquis Who's Who, 1963.
Attribution
 

1827 births
1892 deaths
Dartmouth College alumni
Academics from Portland, Maine
Dartmouth College faculty
Princeton University faculty
Princeton Theological Seminary faculty
Andover Theological Seminary alumni
People from Manchester, Vermont
Presidents of Union College (New York)
Clergy from Portland, Maine
19th-century American clergy